The TVS Apache RR 310 ( RR : Race Replica ) is a touring bike made by the TVS Motor Company in collaboration with BMW Motorrad that was launched in India on December 6, 2017 . it uses a 312.2cc single-cylinder, four-stroke, SI, liquid-cooled, DOHC reverse inclined engine.

Although the engine of the Apache RR 310 is from BMW Motorrad's BMW G310 R platform, the motorcycle was entirely designed by TVS in India. It is the company's first fully-faired production motorcycle.

Design 
The Apache RR 310 is a fully faired motorcycle with a sports-tourer style seating configuration inspired from sharks. The engine uses a reverse inclined configuration. The bike has dual  LED projector headlamps.

Electronics 
The RR 310 has variety of electronics compared to other motorcycles in the Apache series like the RTR 200 4V.

Electronics:-
 Anti-lock braking system: Dual channel
 Rear wheel lift-off protection
 Electronic throttle control: It has four settings, namely Track mode, Sport mode, Urban mode, and Rain mode. Urban and Rain modes limit engine output and maximum speed 
 Electronic fuel injection
 Race computer: Provides various tools such as timers and telemetry, and ergonomics for racing and sports.

Mechanics 
 Slipper clutch

Updates

2019 Update
In May 2019, the motorcycle was updated with a slipper clutch, and the company also introduced a new colour named 'Phantom Black', which replaced the old 'Matte Black' colour.

2020 Update
In January 2020, the motorcycle was launched to cater to the newest emission norms of India known as BS6. Ride by wire throttle gives this motorcycle a better throttle response. Power and torque output remained unchanged. A new colour named 'Titanium Black' was introduced, which replaced the recently introduced 'Phantom Black' colour. The motorcycle was also updated with features like colour TFT screen instrument cluster with mobile phone connectivity and 4 riding modes (Urban, Rain, Sport, and Track). The urban and Rain modes produce low power and torque which offers better fuel consumption. The other updates were newer Michelin Road 5 tyres and the Glide Thru Technology Plus.

2021 Update
In August 2021, the new 2021 model of TVS Apache RR310 was launched. The new model has the addition of new features like adjustable suspension with 20- step rebound damping on the left fork and 20-step compression damping on the right and 15mm pre-load adjustment. .

Performance
The motorcycle's performance numbers as provided by the company are:-

Max. speed: 
Acceleration (0-2sec): .
0-: (time in sec): 2.04s.
0-: (time in sec): 6.17s.

International launch 
In September 2018, TVS launched the bike in Nepal, and in Peru in December 2018.

See also 

 TVS Apache

References

External links

Sport bikes
Apache RR 310
Motorcycles introduced in 2017
Motorcycles of India